Jean-Paul Poulin was a politician in the Canadian province of Quebec. He was active in the Canadian social credit movement and led the Parti crédit social uni (PSCU; English: United Social Credit Party) through four general elections at the provincial level.

Private career

A travelling salesman for many years, Poulin worked as a night watchman in Montreal at the end of the 1970s. In a 1981 interview, he recalled how he convinced farmers to paint their barns with the slogan, "Social Credit is Coming", during the 1960s.

Politician

Early political activities

Poulin first ran for the Social Credit Party of Canada in the 1962 federal election. This party split into two factions the following year, when Réal Caouette formed a separate group called the Ralliement des créditistes. Poulin ran for Caouette's party in the 1968 federal election and also ran for the Ralliement national, a provincial social credit party not endorsed by Caouette, in the 1966 provincial election.

In 1969, the Ralliement des créditistes entered provincial politics by running candidates in four Quebec by-elections. At around the same time, Poulin established a dissident party called the Parti crédit social uni. Then fifty-one years old, he said that he and his allies did not support the way Caouette was running the party. He also indicated that he supported a "strong Quebec in a united Canada".

Poulin ran against the official Ralliement créditiste du Québec candidate in Saint-Jacques in a 1969 by-election. He also ran against an official Créditiste candidate in a 1971 by-election. He was defeated both times, as were all others who ran for his party.

The PSCU seems to have disappeared after this time, and Poulin and his supporters seem to have joined the re-united Social Credit Party of Canada under Caouette's leadership in 1971 or thereafter. Poulin ran for the re-united party in the 1974 federal election.

Return of the PSCU

The provincial Ralliement créditiste du Québec, which was aligned with the federal party, ceased operations in 1978. The PSCU was subsequently re-established, and Poulin again became the party's leader. He stood in three general elections and four by-elections over the next decade, never bringing his party above fringe status.

During the 1981 provincial election, the Montreal Gazette described PCSU as a "hard core" Créditiste group and identified Poulin as a follower of Major C.H. Douglas's economic theories. When interviewed by the paper, Poulin held up a copy of his party's manifesto and said, "This was written in 1966 and I haven't had to change a word."

Poulin was asked for his opinion on abortion during the 1989 provincial election. Perhaps unusually, in light of the Social Credit Party's general social conservatism, he declined to give an opinion and said that the issue should be decided by women alone. In the same election, Poulin said that social credit monetarist policies could not be implemented in Canada at the provincial level; he promised to instead target unemployment if elected. He was seventy-two years old at the time.

The party was deregistered in 1994.

Electoral record
Provincial

There was also a Jean-Paul Poulin who ran as a Liberal candidate in Labelle in the 1962 provincial election, but it is not clear if this was the same person.

Federal

References

Candidates in Quebec provincial elections
Living people
Ralliement créditiste du Québec politicians
Parti crédit social uni politicians
Year of birth missing (living people)